Saint Memnon  the Wonderworker was alive during the second century A.D. He was a hegumen of an Egyptian monastery.  His feast day is April 28 (Eastern Orthodox liturgics).

In the Egyptian desert he practised religious asceticism.

He is said to have performed a number of miracles. Some of his miracles include causing a spring to gush forth, destroying a plague of locusts, curing illnesses and saving boats from destruction.

See also
 Saint Menas
 Temptation of Christ

References 

Saints from Roman Egypt